Yakawewa Grama Niladhari Division is a Grama Niladhari Division of the Medawachchiya Divisional Secretariat of Anuradhapura District of North Central Province, Sri Lanka. It has Grama Niladhari Division Code 50.

Yakawewa is a surrounded by the Puleliya, Kuda Kumbukgollewa, Periyakulama, Thammenna Elawaka, Maradanmaduwa and Sinnasippikulam Grama Niladhari Divisions.

Demographics

Ethnicity 
The Yakawewa Grama Niladhari Division has a Sinhalese majority (63.0%) and a significant Moor population (36.4%). In comparison, the Medawachchiya Divisional Secretariat (which contains the Yakawewa Grama Niladhari Division) has a Sinhalese majority (93.4%)

Religion 
The Yakawewa Grama Niladhari Division has a Buddhist majority (63.1%) and a significant Muslim population (36.3%). In comparison, the Medawachchiya Divisional Secretariat (which contains the Yakawewa Grama Niladhari Division) has a Buddhist majority (92.9%)

References 

Grama Niladhari Divisions of Medawachchiya Divisional Secretariat